is a series of cute 'em ups developed and published by Konami. The games are tongue-in-cheek parodies of Gradius, and also feature characters from many other Konami franchises.

Video games
There are six games in the Parodius series. The last of them, Paro Wars, is a spin-off strategy game.

The only games released outside Japan are From Myth to Laughter and Fantastic Journey, which received European localizations. None of them were released in the Americas.

Parodius games have been ported to several different platforms, including arcade machines, mobile phones, and home consoles.

Compilations

Pachinko machines 
In addition to the video games, a number of Parodius-themed pachinko mechanical games have been released in Japan:

 Little Pirates (1998)
 CR Parodius Da! EX (2000)
 CR Parodius Da! ZE (2000)
 CR Parodius Da! 2 (2000)
 CR Saikoro Chindōchū (2004)
 CR Gokujō Parodius! (2006)
 Gokuraku Parodius (2010)
 Gokuraku Parodius A (2010)

See also
Air Zonk and Super Air Zonk, colorful shooter games by Hudson Soft starring its mascot character
Harmful Park, a PlayStation game inspired by Parodius
Otomedius, another series of parody shooters by Konami
Space Invaders '95, a cartoonish parody of Space Invaders
Star Parodier, a game by Hudson Soft that follows a similar concept
TwinBee, a cartoon-themed series of shooters by Konami

Notes

References